Puertomingalvo is a municipality located at high elevation in the province of Teruel, Aragon, Spain. According to the 2004 census (INE), the municipality has a population of 182 inhabitants.

This town is located close to the Sierra de Mayabona, part of the Iberian System.

References

External links 

 Ficha de la población
 Castillo de Puertomingalvo

Municipalities in the Province of Teruel
Maestrazgo